Exeter City Football Club is a professional association football club based in Exeter, Devon, England. Known as "the Grecians", the origin of their nickname is subject to speculation and debate. The club is owned by the club's supporters through the Exeter City Supporters' Trust. Exeter are one of two Devon clubs who compete in the Football League, the other being Plymouth Argyle. 

Exeter City was founded in 1901 and began playing their games at St James Park, where they remain to this day. They joined Division One of the Southern League in 1904. After a tour of South America in 1914 to generate awareness of football in the continent, the club became the first side to play a national team from Brazil. As a result, City and Brazilian side Fluminense are now also partner clubs. Exeter were invited to help create the Football League Third Division in 1920. They were assigned to the Third Division South the next year and won the Third Division South Cup in 1934. They remained in the division until becoming founder members of the Fourth Division in 1958. They were promoted in 1963–64, only to be relegated after two seasons. They were promoted out of the Fourth Division again at the end of the 1976–77 season and managed to stay in the Third Division for seven seasons before being relegated in 1984.

Exeter won their first league title in the 1989–90 season, gaining promotion as Fourth Division champions under the stewardship of Terry Cooper. Relegated in 1994, they lost their Football League status at the end of the 2002–03 season. They spent five seasons in the Conference, and recovered from defeat in the 2007 play-off final to win promotion out of the play-offs the next year. Manager Paul Tisdale built on this success by winning promotion out of League Two in 2008–09 and Exeter survived for three seasons in League One. Returning to League Two in 2012, they have lost in the play-off finals in 2017, 2018 and most recently in 2020, under Matt Taylor. At the end of the 2021–22 season they gained automatic promotion to League One.

History

Early history

Exeter City F.C. was formed from two predecessor clubs, Exeter United F.C. and St Sidwell's United. Exeter United was a football club from Exeter, Devon, that played between 1890 and 1904. In 1904, Exeter United lost 3–1 to local rivals St Sidwell's United and after the match it was agreed that the two clubs should become one. The new team took the name 'Exeter City' and continued to play at Exeter United's ground, St James Park, where Exeter City still play today. Exeter United was formed from the cricket team of the same name and were one of the first football teams with the moniker 'United'. St Sidwell's United (which had also been known as St Sidwell's Wesleyans and St Sidwell's Old Boys) was a club that had formed from the regulars who frequented the Foresters Inn in Sidwell Street, Exeter, although the public house was always known as the Drum and Monkey. The team played in St Sidwell's old colours of green and white.

On 10 September 1904, Exeter City played its first ever competitive match, a 2–1 victory at St James over 110th Battery of the Royal Artillery, in the East Devon League. The attendance was 600, and the winning goal scored by Sid Thomas, who was to serve the club in various capacities for 70 years. City topped the East Devon League with 11 wins, two draws, one defeat in its first season, and transferred to the Plymouth & District League for next three seasons.

In 1908, Exeter City A.F.C. became a limited company. City became a full-time professional team, and applied successfully for membership of the Southern League, replacing Tottenham Hotspur. A wooden grandstand was erected, and the club entered into a leasing arrangement over the ground.

On 3 October 1908, City got its record highest FA Cup win: Exeter City 14–0 against Weymouth. The match was in the first qualifying round. James 'Daisy' Bell scored six goals, and 10 of Exeter's 14 goals came in the first half.

City changed to its current colours of red and white in 1910. This was after having had a poor start to the season (only two wins out of 11). City abandoned its supposedly unlucky green and white kit, and turned out for the first time in red and white striped shirts at home to West Ham United on 12 November. The result of the game was a 0–0 draw, but five consecutive league wins came for the club in December, and the change of colours stuck.

City made an historic tour of South America in 1914, during which time it played eight matches against teams of Argentina and Brazil. The last match on this tour on 21 July 1914 was an encounter with the first Brazil national football team playing under the authority of a national football association, in this case the Federação Brasileira de Sports, precursor of today's Confederação Brasileira de Futebol, founded just the month before. Brazil, featuring its first great star, Arthur Friedenreich, won this match at the Laranjeiras stadium, Rio de Janeiro, home of Fluminense Football Club with 2–0. The tour yielded five wins, one draw and two defeats. The only other loss was in a match that kicked off 12 hours after the players got off the boat.

Exeter City were invited by the Football League to become founder members of the Third Division in 1920.

Football League (1920–2003)

City's historic first match in the Football League took place on Saturday 28 August 1920, when Brentford was the visiting team to St James Park. Exeter won 3–0. At the end of the season, the third tier of the League was being geographically divided, thus City was assigned to the Third Division South.

In 1931, City reached the sixth round of the FA Cup, losing a replay 4–2 to Sunderland in front of its largest ever home gate. 50 years later, City reached the sixth round again, but lost 2–0 to eventual winners Tottenham Hotspur. Earlier Exeter had beaten Newcastle United 4–0 having beaten Leicester City in the previous round.

In the 1932–33 season they achieved their highest position in the League, 2nd in the Third Division South, but remained there because at the time only the champions were promoted. It was the closest they ever came to promotion to the second tier of English football.

In the 1963–64 season, City achieved their first ever promotion, going up to Division Three. However, City were relegated just two seasons later. It wasn't until 1977 that they would return to Division Three, under the guidance of Bobby Saxton.

The end of the 1970s and the very early 1980s were regarded as City's most successful spell in the Third Division, including a finish of 8th in 1979–80 and an FA Cup run the following season. Star players included Tony Kellow, John Delve and David Pullar.

City's only major trophy so far has been the Fourth Division Championship which it won in 1990. In that season, City won 20 league games at St James Park, and remained undefeated in 31 home matches, including dramatic draws against Norwich City in the FA Cup third round and Sunderland in the League Cup 4th round, both of which featured late equalisers for the visitors.

Following that promotion, City rarely shone at the higher level. The departure of manager Terry Cooper and key players such as Shaun Taylor, Richard Dryden, Clive Whitehead, Brian McDermott and Steve Neville left new boss Alan Ball to pick up the pieces. There were some successes under the former World Cup winner—including winning both games against local rivals Plymouth in the clubs' first derbies for a decade in the 1992/93 season—but Ball left for Southampton in January 1994 and the returning Cooper was unable to save Exeter from relegation.

Back in the bottom division, City struggled for nearly a decade, with chairman Ivor Doble taking the club into administration and starting a chain of events that resulted in the sale of the club's ground. In November 1994, the club almost went out of business and sold its stadium to Beazer for £650,000, but were able to stay there after the local council took it over. After nearly two years on the brink of closure, the club came out of administration on 1 August 1996, although the problems on the field were far from over.

In 2003, City finished 23rd in Division Three and was relegated to the Conference National; Exeter were the first club to suffer automatic relegation without finishing bottom of the league. City won their last game against Southend United 1–0, but were still relegated as Swansea City's victory over Hull City left the Grecians one point short of safety.

Conference era (2003–2008)

Following relegation to the Conference, the club was taken over by the Exeter City Supporters' Trust, purchasing a majority shareholding on 5 September 2003. In May 2007 two of the Directors who had been in charge during season 2002–2003 were convicted of fraudulent trading at the club, John Russell receiving a prison sentence and Mike Lewis a community service sentence.

Several million pounds in debt and with no big investor in sight, the Trust kept the club going through fund-raising activities amongst rank-and-file supporters. Complex legal arguments with both Inland Revenue and football authorities meant that City's first season of non-league football was plagued by off-the-field uncertainty. The claim was finally dropped in June 2004.

In 2004, a Creditors Voluntary Arrangement (CVA) was put in place to reduce the club's debts. Through the club's "Red or Dead" scheme, hundreds of fans pledged at least £500 each to fund the CVA repayments, but the FA Cup proved to be the income boost the Grecians had needed, as City drew Manchester United away in the third round of the FA Cup. City drew 0–0 at Old Trafford in January 2005, gaining £653,511 as City's share of receipts from the 67,511 attendance. Further income from a televised replay—won 2–0 by United—coupled with ongoing fund-raising and unpaid work from the club's supporters helped the club to repay its debts, and the CVA was cleared in December 2005.

2004 also saw the club's centenary. In May 2004 a friendly fixture was arranged against a Brazilian masters team at St James Park, a celebration of City's South American tour of 1914. The Brazilian team, containing such notable players as Careca and Dunga, won 1–0.

City's first team finished the 2006–07 season in fifth place, qualifying for the play-offs. After beating Oxford United on penalties in the semi-final, City met Morecambe at Wembley in the final, where they lost 2–1 despite taking an early lead.

Exeter reached the play-off final in the following season; this time Exeter looked to be heading out of the play-offs after losing the first leg of the semi-final at home to local rivals Torquay United 2–1, but came back to win the second leg 4–1 with 3 goals in the last 20 minutes. In the final Exeter met Cambridge United in front of a Conference play-off record crowd of 42,511, winning 1–0 with a goal from Rob Edwards, earning promotion to League Two.

Return to the Football League (2008–present)

League Two (2008–2009)
The club followed its success in the Conference by finishing as runners up to Brentford in League Two. A goal from Richard Logan helped Exeter to win promotion to League One with a 1–0 win away to Rotherham United on the last day of the season.

League One (2009–2012)
2009–2010 was Exeter's 45th season in the third tier of English football. They have played more seasons in the third tier than any club who have never reached the top two tiers. They survived their first season at this level for 16 years by one point; an 82nd-minute Ryan Harley goal against Huddersfield Town on the final day of the season saw Exeter overcome the promotion chasers 2–1 and relegated Gillingham in the process.

The club suffered a tragedy on 10 August 2010, days after the start of the 2010–11 season, when striker Adam Stansfield died of cancer aged 31. As a result, their next fixture against Dagenham & Redbridge on 14 August was postponed as a mark of respect. Exeter recovered well, however, and finished 8th in the league that season, one point off a playoff spot.

Following such a strong season, hopes were high for the 2011–12 season, but poor away form (with just two wins away from home all season) saw Exeter relegated to League Two. Relegation was confirmed on 28 April 2012, following a 4–1 defeat away to Carlisle United.

League Two (2012–2022)
The club remains owned by its fans, through the Exeter City Supporters Trust. During the 2012–2013 season saw Exeter have a marginally successful season, spending the season travelling up and down the top half of the season from 1st place to 10th. Exeter set new club record for away wins in a single season, winning 11 of their 23 fixtures away from home. City had one of the highest away win percentage of the season however disappointing home form lead them to fall into the playoff positions only to see a poor end-of-season run leaving them to fall into 10th position; despite their earlier automatic promotion and then reestimated playoff ambitions. Tisdale claimed that injuries were to blame for City missing out on the play-offs.

At the end of the 2012–13 campaign, poor funds and lack of income led to an unfortunate squad trim with boss Paul Tisdale having to let go: Jamie Cureton, lead goal scorer of the last campaign netting over 21 goals and the 2010 campaign (with similar statistics); Guillem Bauzà, Kevin Amankwaah, unable to renew his contract despite his fan-favourite status and great playing abilities heralding fan chants and songs; Mark Molesley, despite being there only half a season; Rhys Evans and later Tully's new contract was withdrawn due to financial constraints. Despite this Tisdale managed to sign Sam Parkin and Doug Bergqvist.

In 2013–2014, Exeter participated in Football League Two and the Football League Cup, but they were eliminated in the first round of the competition by Queens Park Rangers. In the FA Cup Exeter City were knocked out by Peterborough United in the first round. In the League 2 season, Exeter finished in 16th.

In pre-season, after a 0–1 friendly loss to Reading, the club went on a short tour in Brazil to commemorate 100 years since they played the Brazil National Football Team. Exeter drew 0–0 against Fluminense under 23's and then beat sides Tupi and a Rio Cricket Club 2–1 and 3–1 respectively. Exeter finished pre-season with 2–0 home losses to Swansea City and Torquay United.

Exeter City's opening matches of 2014–15 were a 1–1 draw against Portsmouth in League Two and then a 0–2 loss against AFC Bournemouth in the Football League Cup. Both matches were played at St James Park. In the 2014–15 FA Cup in the first round, they were beaten 1–0 away to Warrington Town, a club 100 places lower than them at that current point in the season. The game was also broadcast live on BBC Two. The Grecians finished tenth in League Two in 2014–15, their play-off push just falling short in the final few weeks.

City finished in 14th position in 2015–16, a season that included a memorable 2–2 draw against Premier League Liverpool in the FA Cup.

In the 2016–17 season, City started badly, and were bottom of the league by November. However, a turnaround in form saw Exeter finish 5th in the league, and earn a playoff spot. Following a thrilling 3–3 draw in the first leg of the semi-final at Carlisle, the second leg, tied at 2–2, looked destined to go to extra time. But, in the 95th minute, Jack Stacey's long range shot with his weak foot fired Exeter into the final, earning them a spot at Wembley. The final took place on 28 May, and Exeter faced Blackpool. Their hopes for promotion were shattered when they conceded a goal within 3 minutes, and although they equalised, City eventually lost the game 2–1.

On the back of the play-off final defeat Exeter began the 2017–18 season unbeaten after 5 games, notably beating Cheltenham in a 7 goal thriller. Like in the season before, they reached the play-off final, again being on the losing side, this time against Coventry.

On 1 June 2018, Exeter announced that, after 12 years as manager, Paul Tisdale had decided not to sign a new contract with the club, which announced that Matt Taylor, a former captain and Under 23 team coach, had been appointed manager.

League One (2022–present)
On 26 April 2022, Exeter gained promotion to the EFL League One following a 2-1 win over Barrow at St James Park and went onto finish the 2021–22 EFL League Two season in second place.

Nickname
The club is nicknamed The Grecians, a name whose origin remains the subject of much speculation.

One suggestion is that in 1908 the club voted for the name because of its association with St Sidwells parish. Historically people living in the parish of St Sidwells were said to have been known as "Greeks" or "Grecians". This is possibly due to the parish's location beyond the city walls. For instance, in Homer's epic poem the Iliad the Greek forces laid siege to the walls of Troy.

However, perhaps more plausibly, the association arose because of rivalries between city boys and those of St Sidwells during the annual beating the bounds.

It has also been suggested the name derived from a group of children in St Sidwells who were referred to as the 'Greasy Un's'. A further possibility was that it derived from a jeweller's shop in Sidwell Street, close to the ground, which had a clock hanging outside displaying the name 'Grecians' on its face.

Yet another theory suggests that it is a corruption of Caerwysg, the Welsh name for Exeter (Caer = fort, Wysg = Exe – fort on the river Exe, similar to the Cornish Karesk). Thus, citizens could have been known as Caer Iscuns and so possibly mutating to Grecians.

Supporters and rivalries

Famous fans
Famous fans include David Earl,Coldplay frontman Chris Martin, Adrian Edmondson, Noel Edmonds, swimmer Liam Tancock, and Hoosiers drummer Alan Sharland. Singer Joss Stone signed up as a member of the supporters trust, being introduced to fans on the pitch as a new member during a League Cup match against Liverpool.

In 2002 pop singer Michael Jackson was made honorary director of Exeter City. He visited St James Park with celebrity friend Uri Geller, who was also a director. The crew of  also adopted Exeter City as their home team and use their strip when playing games.

Rivalries

A survey conducted by Football Fans Census in 2003 revealed that Exeter City supporters consider their main rival to be Plymouth Argyle. The two clubs first met in a competitive fixture in 1908 when both sides were in the Southern League, and have contested matches intermittently during their histories due to Plymouth Argyle usually being in a higher division. Supporters also share a friendlier rivalry with Torquay United, a club whose supporters view Exeter as their main rival. The two clubs are closer geographically and have met more often during their respective histories, having first played a competitive match in 1927 after Torquay were elected to the Football League. Matches between the three clubs are known as Devon derbies. Despite their on-field rivalry, Torquay helped Exeter during their financial difficulties of 2003 by waiving their gate receipts in a pre-season friendly. This gesture was returned in 2015 when Exeter gave the Gulls their gate receipts as a result of Torquay's financial difficulties, having had to close down their academy and terminate the contract of manager Chris Hargreaves.

Players

Current squad

Out on loan

Retired numbers 

Following Adam Stansfield's death from colorectal cancer during the 2010–11 season, the club retired his number 9 shirt for the following nine seasons. From the 2020–21 season onwards, the shirt number is worn only by players from the club's own academy. On 2 September 2022, it was announced that Stansfield's son Jay Stansfield would return to Exeter City on a season-long loan basis, thus following in the footsteps of his late-father by wearing the number 9 shirt.

Notable former players 

Notable former players include Harry Gee who during the 1927–28 season made 29 appearances for the club scoring 2 goals. He retired from professional after just one season at the club suffering a career ending broken leg, Harry had formerly played for the championship winning Burnley F.C. side of 1921/22. Cliff Bastin, who went on to play for Arsenal and England, Maurice Setters, who won an F.A. Cup winner's medal with Manchester United in 1963, and goalkeeper Dick Pym, who later played for Bolton Wanderers and England. Pym's sale to Bolton in 1921, for a fee of £5,000, allowed City to purchase St. James Park.

Other well-known players include the prolific 1930s striker Fred Whitlow, Arnold Mitchell, who played 495 games for City, Tony Kellow, City's record goalscorer, Ian Main, the gifted goalkeeper from the club's most successful years who died very young, Fred Binney and Darran Rowbotham in the 1980s and early 90s. Former England winger Lee Sharpe played four games for Exeter at the beginning of their 2002–03 Division Three campaign, scoring two goals.

Former City player George Reader went on to referee the 1950 World Cup final, becoming the first Englishman to do so.

David Pleat scored 14 goals for Exeter whilst playing for them between 1968 and 1970. He went on to manage several successful clubs, including Tottenham Hotspur, before becoming a football media pundit for ITV and Radio 5 Live.

In recent times, Exeter City Academy graduates Dean Moxey, George Friend, Matt Grimes, Ethan Ampadu and Ollie Watkins have gone on to play in the Premier League, while Danny Seaborne and Elliott Frear established themselves as regulars in the Scottish Premier League. Ampadu (son of former Arsenal and Exeter City player Kwame Ampadu) won his first Wales cap in 2017, and played for his country at UEFA Euro 2020. Watkins, meanwhile, who while at the club was named 2017 EFL Young Player of the Season and left Exeter for a 'club record fee', won his first England cap in 2021. Jamie Mackie, who played for the Grecians between 2005 and 2008, went on to play 60 Premier League games for QPR, and picked up 9 caps for Scotland.

In a survey published by the Professional Footballers' Association in December 2007, Alan Banks was listed as the all-time favourite player amongst Exeter City fans.

Hall of Fame 
In 2014 Exeter City – in partnership with the Exeter College, the Heritage Lottery Fund, the South West Heritage Trust and the ECFCST History Group – launched the Hall of Fame. The Hall of Fame aims to recognise the achievements and contributions made by 'genuine legends' to the club.

The following players have been inducted into the Hall of Fame:

Non-playing staff

Corporate hierarchy

Coaching staff

Managerial history

Chairmen 
The following have been chairman of the club:

† Indicates spell as co-chairman

Honours and achievements

League

Third Division South / League One (Tier 3)
Runners-up (1): 1932–33 – Exeter's highest ever league position
Fourth Division / League Two  (Tier 4)
Champions (1): 1989–90
2nd place promotion (3): 1976–77, 2008–09, 2021–22
4th place promotion (1): 1963–64
Conference (Tier 5)
Play-off winners (1): 2007–08
Play-off finalists (1): 2006–07

Cups 

FA Cup
Quarter-finalists (2): 1930–31, 1980–81
Football League Third Division South Cup
Winners (1): 1933–34
Football League Trophy
Southern Section Finalists (3): 1992–93, 1999–2000, 2010–11

Non-league
FA Trophy
Semi-finalists (1): 2005–06
Devon St. Luke's Challenge Cup
Winners (22): 1925–26, 1926–27, 1927–28, 1953–54, 1958–59, 1960–61, 1961–62, 1962–63, 1963–64, 1964–65, 1967–68, 1973–74, 1984–85, 1985–86, 1986–87, 1996–97, 1997–98, 2001–02, 2003–04, 2004–05, 2008–09, 2018–19.
East Devon Senior Cup
Winners (3): 1953–54, 1980–81, 1981–82
Runners-up (1): 1903–04 – as St. Sidwell's United
Trowbridge Charity Cup
Winners (1): 1927–28
Hospital Cup
Winners (1): 1969–70
Bill Slee Cup
Winners (1): 1985–86
 Brian Lomax Supporters Direct Cup
Winners (1): 2017–18

Club records
Largest league victory
8–1 v. Coventry City, 1926
8–1 v. Aldershot, 1935 (the score was 0–0 against Aldershot at half-time).
Largest FA Cup victory – 14–0 v. Weymouth, 1908.
Largest aggregate score - 11-6 v Crystal Palace, Third Division South Cup 1933-34.
Largest league defeat
0–9 vs. Notts County, 1948
0–9 vs. Northampton Town, 1958.
Record home attendance – 20,984 vs. Sunderland, FA Cup Sixth Round Replay, 1931.
Record away attendance – 67,551 vs. Manchester United at Old Trafford, FA Cup Third Round, 2005
Most away victories in a single league season – 13 victories (from 23 matches) in 2016/17.

See also
 Exeter City Supporters' Trust
 Exeter City Women F.C.
 List of fan-owned sports teams

References

External links

Exeter City Supporters' Trust official website
Grecian Archive (official club archive)

 
1904 establishments in England
Association football clubs established in 1904
Football clubs in Devon
Football clubs in England
Sport in Exeter
Southern Football League clubs
English Football League clubs
National League (English football) clubs
Companies that have entered administration in the United Kingdom
Fan-owned football clubs in England